Goodrich may refer to:
 Goodrich (surname)

Places

United Kingdom
 Goodrich, Herefordshire
 Goodrich Castle, a fortification in Goodrich, Herefordshire
 Goodrich Court, a former neo-gothic castle in Goodrich, Herefordshire

United States
 Goodrich, Colorado
 Goodrich, Idaho
 Goodrich, Michigan
 Goodrich, North Dakota
 Goodrich, Tennessee
 Goodrich, Texas
 Goodrich, Wisconsin, a town
 Goodrich (community), Wisconsin, an unincorporated community
 Goodrich Falls, waterfall and unincorporated community in New Hampshire

Other uses 
 Goodrich Corporation or B.F. Goodrich Company, former American aerospace manufacturing company
 BFGoodrich, American tires company
 Goodrich Quality Theaters, American movie theater chain

See also 
 Goderich (disambiguation)
 Godric (disambiguation)